Daily Journal Corporation is an American publishing company and technology company headquartered in Los Angeles, California. The company has offices in Corona, Oakland, Riverside, Sacramento, San Diego, San Francisco, San Jose, and Santa Ana in California, and in Denver, Colorado ; Logan, Utah ; Phoenix, Arizona and Melbourne, Australia.

Governance
The Daily Journal Corporation has been publicly traded since 1987 on the NASDAQ under DJCO. Its chairman is Steven Myhill-Jones. Charles T. Munger, who is also vice chairman of Berkshire Hathaway, is the former chairman and a current director.

Publishing business
The original newspaper, The Daily Court Journal (Los Angeles), began publication in 1888. Charles T. Munger purchased the paper in 1977 and through a series of acquisitions and organic growth built it into a group of newspapers and websites that provide information on the legal industry, real estate and general business. The company now publishes 10 newspapers in California and Arizona. Its largest publications are the Los Angeles Daily Journal and the San Francisco Daily Journal. The Daily Journal newspapers have won numerous awards for its journalism, with the Los Angeles Press Club in 2003 noting that the Los Angeles Daily Journal was "the most award-winning newspaper in Los Angeles with the sole exception of the Los Angeles Times."

Newspapers

 Business Journal (Riverside, California)
 Daily Commerce (Los Angeles, California)
 The Daily Recorder (Sacramento, California)
 The Daily Transcript (San Diego, California)
 The Inter-City Express (Oakland, California)
 Los Angeles Daily Journal (Los Angeles, California)
 Orange County Reporter (Santa Ana, California)
 San Francisco Daily Journal (San Francisco, California)
 San Jose Post-Record (San Jose, California)
 The Record Reporter (Phoenix, Arizona)

Online
 California Lawyer (San Francisco, California)

Advertising and newspaper representative
The Daily Journal's publications carry commercial advertising, and most also contain public notice advertising. Commercial advertising consists of display and classified advertising and the employment advertising marketplace. 
Public notice advertising consists of many types of legal notices required by law to be published in an adjudicated newspaper of general circulation, including notices of death, fictitious business names, trustee sale notices and notices of governmental hearings. The major types of public notice advertisers are real estate–related businesses and trustees, governmental agencies, attorneys and businesses or individuals filing fictitious business name statements.

A fictitious business name web site, www.DBAstore.com, enables individuals to send their statements to the company for filing and publication and another web site, www.LegalAdStore.com, enables attorneys and individuals to send probate, civil, corporate, public sale and other types of public notices to the company.

California Newspaper Service Bureau
"CNSB", a division of the company, is a statewide newspaper representative specializing since 1934 in public notice advertising. CNSB places public notices and other forms of advertising with adjudicated newspapers of general circulation, most of which are not owned by The Daily Journal.

Technology business
Journal Technologies, Inc. is a wholly owned subsidiary of the Company. It consists of the combined operations of Sustain Technologies, Inc., established in the mid-1980s and acquired by the Daily Journal Corporation in 1999; New Dawn Technologies, Inc., acquired in 2012; and ISD Technologies, Inc., acquired in 2013.

Journal Technologies makes software for trial and appellate courts and agencies related to court systems, including prosecutorial agencies, public defenders, probation departments and pretrial offices, throughout the United States, Canada and Australia.

Journal Technologies has distinguished itself in the market with a browser-based case management system that is a highly configurable business processing engine that is the centerpiece for document management and e-filing.

See also

 Economy of California
 List of California companies

References

External links
 
 Journal Technologies 

1986 establishments in the United States
Companies based in Los Angeles
Companies listed on the Nasdaq
Magazine publishing companies of the United States
Newspaper companies of the United States
Publishing companies based in California
Publishing companies established in 1986
Software companies based in California
Technology companies based in Greater Los Angeles
Software companies of the United States
1980s initial public offerings